The Union Navy used tinclad warships during the American Civil War.  These vessels were generally converted civilian ships, although a few were purpose-built for the United States War Department; some had formerly been in Confederate service.  Conversion of civilian steamboats into tinclad warships included arming the vessels, adding a wooden casemate, and armoring portions of the vessel.  Compared to ironclad warships, tinclads were cheaper, required smaller crews, and could enter shallower water due to their light drafts.  While tinclads were poorly suited to engage heavy artillery or other warships, they were better equipped to combat small groups of enemy soldiers.  Tinclads were frequently used for escort and patrol duties, and sometimes provided naval support for other military actions.  A total of 74 saw service during the war.

Background

During the American Civil War, the control of the rivers of the United States of America and the Confederate States of America was strategically important.  Both sides purchased civilian steamboats for conversion into warships.  Both sides built ironclads, warships with heavy iron armor, and early in the war Union forces built several timberclads, vessels that used layers of wood as armor.  A third type of vessel used by the Union Navy was the tinclad warship.  Tinclads were generally converted civilian vessels, although several were purpose-built for the United States War Department late in the war.  The process of converting a civilian steamer into a tinclad involved arming the ships (originally with either six or eight cannons, although it was eventually found advisable to add heavier cannon to the vessels), adding a casemate made of wood and at least partially covered with thin iron armor, replacing the existing pilothouse with a better-armored one, reinforcing decks and internal beams, and removing the texas.

Tinclads were cheaper than ironclads, easier to produce, required smaller crews, and their smaller drafts allowed them to enter shallower water than other warships could.  Another drawback to the ironclads was that they were generally ineffective against small groups of enemy soldiers, while the tinclads were better suited to handle such threats. However, the tinclads were poorly suited for engaging heavy artillery or enemy warships. During the war, the tinclads performed patrols on the rivers, protected and escorted other vessels, and sometimes acted as naval support for military actions.  Seventy-four tinclads entered service during the war.

List of tinclads
Beginning on June 19, 1863, the tinclads were assigned identifying numbers, which were painted on each vessel's pilothouse.

Notes

References

Sources
 
 
 
 
 

Lists of ships of the United States
Union Navy